Narendra Modi, the leader of Bharatiya Janata Party, was sworn in as Chief Minister of Gujarat for third time on 25 December 2007 following victory in 2007 Gujarat Legislative Assembly election.

Cabinet ministers
Vajubhai Vala 
Anandiben Patel 
Narottam Patel
Ramanlal Vora
Mangubhai Patel
Nitin Patel
Dilip Singhani
Fakir Vaghela 
Jaynarayan Vyas

Ministers of State
Amit Shah 
Saurabh Patel
Jaswantsinh Babhor
Purshottam Solanki 
Maya Kodnani
Parbat Patel
Kirtisinh Rana
Jaysinh Chauhan
Vasan Ahir

References

 https://www.news18.com/news/politics/modi-expands-cabinet-turns-god-for-gujaratis-279682.html

Modi 03
Modi 3
Chief Ministership of Narendra Modi
2007 establishments in Gujarat
Cabinets established in 2007
2012 disestablishments in India
Cabinets disestablished in 2012